Pia is a commune in the Pyrénées-Orientales department in southern France.

Geography 
Pia is located in the canton of La Côte Salanquaise and in the arrondissement of Perpignan.

Population

Sport
Baroudeurs de Pia XIII are a semi-professional rugby league club based in the town, who compete in the Elite One Championship.

See also
Communes of the Pyrénées-Orientales department

References

External links

 Official Website of the Town of Pia

Communes of Pyrénées-Orientales